In mathematics, a binary quadratic form is a quadratic homogeneous polynomial in two variables

 

where a, b, c are the coefficients. When the coefficients can be arbitrary complex numbers, most results are not specific to the case of two variables, so they are described in quadratic form.  A quadratic form with integer coefficients is called an integral binary quadratic form, often abbreviated to binary quadratic form.

This article is entirely devoted to integral binary quadratic forms.  This choice is motivated by their status as the driving force behind the development of algebraic number theory.  Since the late nineteenth century, binary quadratic forms have given up their preeminence in algebraic number theory to quadratic and more general number fields, but advances specific to binary quadratic forms still occur on occasion.

 and so on are quadratic forms, and the theory of quadratic forms gives a unified way of looking at and proving these theorems.

Another instance of quadratic forms is Pell's equation .

Binary quadratic forms are closely related to ideals in quadratic fields, this allows the class number of a quadratic field to be calculated by counting the number of reduced binary quadratic forms of a given discriminant.

Equivalence 

Two forms f and g are called equivalent if there exist integers  such that the following conditions hold:

 

The above equivalence conditions define an equivalence relation on the set of integral quadratic forms.  It follows that the quadratic forms are partitioned into equivalence classes, called classes of quadratic forms. A class invariant can mean either a function defined on equivalence classes of forms or a property shared by all forms in the same class.

Since Gauss it has been recognized that this definition is inferior to that given above. If there is a need to distinguish, sometimes forms are called properly equivalent using the definition above and  improperly equivalent if they are equivalent in Lagrange's sense.

In matrix terminology, which is used occasionally below, when

  

The equivalence relation above then arises from the general theory of group actions.

If , then important invariants include

 The discriminant .
 The content, equal to the greatest common divisor of a, b, and c.

Terminology has arisen for classifying classes and their forms in terms of their invariants. A form of discriminant  is definite if , degenerate if  is a perfect square, and indefinite otherwise. A form is primitive if its content is 1, that is, if its coefficients are coprime.  If a form's discriminant is a fundamental discriminant, then the form is primitive. Discriminants satisfy

Automorphisms 

If f is a quadratic form, a matrix

  

For example, the matrix

 

is an automorphism of the form . When f is definite, the group is finite, and when f is indefinite, it is infinite and cyclic.

Representation

Examples 

When , we have
 

so we find pairs  that do the trick. In all, there are sixteen different solution pairs. On the other hand, when , the equation

 

does not have integer solutions. We can check these nine pairs directly to see that none of them satisfies , so the equation does not have integer solutions.

There are only a finite number of pairs satisfying this constraint.

Another ancient problem involving quadratic forms asks us to solve Pell's equation. For instance, we may seek integers x and y so that . Changing signs of x and y in a solution gives another solution, so it is enough to seek just solutions in positive integers. For instance, from the pair , we compute

 ,

and we can check that this satisfies .  Iterating this process, we find further pairs  with :

  
These values will keep growing in size, so we see there are infinitely many ways to represent 1 by the form .  This recursive description was discussed in Theon of Smyrna's commentary on Euclid's Elements.

The representation problem 

The oldest problem in the theory of binary quadratic forms is the representation problem: describe the representations of a given number  by a given quadratic form f.  "Describe" can mean various things: give an algorithm to generate all representations, a closed formula for the number of representations, or even just determine whether any representations exist.

The examples above discuss the representation problem for the numbers 3 and 65 by the form  and for the number 1 by the form .
In the first case, the sixteen representations were explicitly described. There is a closed formula

 

There are several class invariants relevant to the representation problem:

 The set of integers represented by a class.  If an integer n is represented by a form in a class, then it is represented by all other forms in a class.
 The minimum absolute value represented by a class.  This is the smallest nonnegative value in the set of integers represented by a class.
 The congruence classes modulo the discriminant of a class represented by the class.

The minimum absolute value represented by a class is zero for degenerate classes and positive for definite and indefinite classes.  All numbers represented by a definite form  have the same sign: positive if  and negative if .  For this reason, the former are called positive definite forms and the latter are negative definite.

The number of representations of an integer n by a form f is finite if f is definite and infinite if f is indefinite.

Equivalent representations 

The notion of equivalence of forms can be extended to equivalent representations.

 

with integer entries and determinant 1 so that  and

 

The above conditions give a (right) action of the group  on the set of representations of integers by binary quadratic forms.  It follows that equivalence defined this way is an equivalence relation and in particular that the forms in equivalent representations are equivalent forms.

As an example, let  and consider a representation .  Such a representation is a solution to the Pell equation described in the examples above. The matrix

 

has determinant 1 and is an automorphism of f. Acting on the representation  by this matrix yields the equivalent representation . Iterating this matrix action, we find that the infinite set of representations of 1 by f that were determined above are all equivalent.

There are generally finitely many equivalence classes of representations of an integer n by forms of given nonzero discriminant . A complete set of representatives for these classes can be given in terms of reduced forms defined in the section below. When , every representation is equivalent to a unique representation by a reduced form, so a complete set of representatives is given by the finitely many representations of n by reduced forms of discriminant . The set of all such representations constitutes a complete set of representatives for equivalence classes of representations.

Reduction and class numbers 

Gauss gave a superior reduction algorithm in Disquisitiones Arithmeticae, which ever since has been the reduction algorithm most commonly given in textbooks.  In 1981, Zagier published an alternative reduction algorithm which has found several uses as an alternative to Gauss's.

Composition 

Composition most commonly refers to a binary operation on primitive equivalence classes of forms of the same discriminant, one of the deepest discoveries of Gauss, which makes this set into a finite abelian group called the form class group (or simply class group) of discriminant .  Class groups have since become one of the central ideas in algebraic number theory.  From a modern perspective, the class group of a fundamental discriminant  is isomorphic to the narrow class group of the quadratic field  of discriminant . For negative , the narrow class group is the same as the ideal class group, but for positive  it may be twice as big.

"Composition" also sometimes refers to, roughly, a binary operation on binary quadratic forms.  The word "roughly" indicates two caveats:  only certain pairs of binary quadratic forms can be composed, and the resulting form is not well-defined (although its equivalence class is).  The composition operation on equivalence classes is defined by first defining composition of forms and then showing that this induces a well-defined operation on classes.

"Composition" can also refer to a binary operation on representations of integers by forms.  This operation is substantially more complicated than composition of forms, but arose first historically.  We will consider such operations in a separate section below.

Composition means taking 2 quadratic forms of the same discriminant and combining them to create a quadratic form of the same discriminant, as follows from Brahmagupta's identity.

Composing forms and classes 

A variety of definitions of composition of forms has been given, often in an attempt to simplify the extremely technical and general definition of Gauss.  We present here Arndt's method, because it remains rather general while being simple enough to be amenable to computations by hand.  An alternative definition is described at Bhargava cubes.

We perform the following steps:

 Solve the system of congruences It can be shown that this system always has a unique integer solution modulo .  We arbitrarily choose such a solution and call it B.
 Compute C such that .  It can be shown that C is an integer.

We see that its first coefficient is well-defined, but the other two depend on the choice of B and C.  One way to make this a well-defined operation is to make an arbitrary convention for how to choose B—for instance, choose B to be the smallest positive solution to the system of congruences above. Alternatively, we may view the result of composition, not as a form, but as an equivalence class of forms modulo the action of the group of matrices of the form

 ,

where n is an integer.  If we consider the class of  under this action, the middle coefficients of the forms in the class form a congruence class of integers modulo 2A.  Thus, composition gives a well-defined function from pairs of binary quadratic forms to such classes.

It follows that composition induces a well-defined operation on primitive  classes of discriminant , and as mentioned above, Gauss showed these classes form a finite abelian group. The identity class in the group is the unique class containing all forms , i.e., with first coefficient 1. (It can be shown that all such forms lie in a single class, and the restriction  implies that there exists such a form of every discriminant.)

Genera of binary quadratic forms 

Gauss also considered a coarser notion of equivalence, with each coarse class called a genus of forms.  Each genus is the union of a finite number of equivalence classes of the same discriminant, with the number of classes depending only on the discriminant. In the context of binary quadratic forms, genera can be defined either through congruence classes of numbers represented by forms or by genus characters defined on the set of forms.  A third definition is a special case of the genus of a quadratic form in n variables.  This states that forms are in the same genus if they are locally equivalent at all rational primes (including the Archimedean place).

History 

There is circumstantial evidence of protohistoric knowledge of algebraic identities involving binary quadratic forms.  The first problem concerning binary quadratic forms asks for the existence or construction of representations of integers by particular binary quadratic forms.  The prime examples are the solution of Pell's equation and the representation of integers as sums of two squares.  Pell's equation was already considered by the Indian mathematician Brahmagupta in the 7th century CE. Several centuries later, his ideas were extended to a complete solution of Pell's equation known as the chakravala method, attributed to either of the Indian mathematicians Jayadeva or Bhāskara II. The problem of representing integers by sums of two squares was considered in the 3rd century by Diophantus.  In the 17th century, inspired while reading Diophantus's Arithmetica, Fermat made several observations about representations by specific quadratic forms including that which is now known as Fermat's theorem on sums of two squares. Euler provided the first proofs of Fermat's observations and added some new conjectures about representations by specific forms, without proof.

The general theory of quadratic forms was initiated by Lagrange in 1775 in his Recherches d'Arithmétique.  Lagrange was the first to realize that "a coherent general theory required the simulatenous consideration of all forms."  He was the first to recognize the importance of the discriminant and to define the essential notions of equivalence and reduction, which, according to Weil, have "dominated the whole subject of quadratic forms ever since".  Lagrange showed that there are finitely many equivalence classes of given discriminant, thereby defining for the first time an arithmetic class number.  His introduction of reduction allowed the quick enumeration of the classes of given discriminant and foreshadowed the eventual development of infrastructure. In 1798, Legendre published Essai sur la théorie des nombres, which summarized the work of Euler and Lagrange and added some of his own contributions, including the first glimpse of a composition operation on forms.

The theory was vastly extended and refined by Gauss in Section V of Disquisitiones Arithmeticae. Gauss introduced a very general version of a composition operator that allows composing even forms of different discriminants and imprimitive forms.  He replaced Lagrange's equivalence with the more precise notion of proper equivalence, and this enabled him to show that the primitive classes of given discriminant form a group under the composition operation. He introduced genus theory, which gives a powerful way to understand the quotient of the class group by the subgroup of squares.  (Gauss and many subsequent authors wrote 2b in place of b; the modern convention allowing the coefficient of xy to be odd is due to Eisenstein).

These investigations of Gauss strongly influenced both the arithmetical theory of quadratic forms in more than two variables and the subsequent development of algebraic number theory, where quadratic fields are replaced with more general number fields.  But the impact was not immediate.  Section V of Disquisitiones contains truly revolutionary ideas and involves very complicated computations, sometimes left to the reader.  Combined, the novelty and complexity made Section V notoriously difficult. Dirichlet published simplifications of the theory that made it accessible to a broader audience.  The culmination of this work is his text Vorlesungen über Zahlentheorie.  The third edition of this work includes two supplements by Dedekind.  Supplement XI introduces ring theory, and from then on, especially after the 1897 publication of Hilbert's Zahlbericht, the theory of binary quadratic forms lost its preeminent position in algebraic number theory and became overshadowed by the more general theory of algebraic number fields.

Even so, work on binary quadratic forms with integer coefficients continues to the present.  This includes numerous results about quadratic number fields, which can often be translated into the language of binary quadratic forms, but also includes developments about forms themselves or that originated by thinking about forms, including Shanks's infrastructure, Zagier's reduction algorithm, Conway's topographs, and Bhargava's reinterpretation of composition through Bhargava cubes.

See also
 Bhargava cube
Fermat's theorem on sums of two squares
 Legendre symbol
 Brahmagupta's identity

Notes

References
 Johannes Buchmann, Ulrich Vollmer: Binary Quadratic Forms, Springer, Berlin 2007, 
 Duncan A. Buell: Binary Quadratic Forms, Springer, New York 1989
 David A Cox, Primes of the form , Fermat, class field theory, and complex multiplication

External links
 Peter Luschny, Positive numbers represented by a binary quadratic form
 

Quadratic forms